Hattstedt was an Amt ("collective municipality") in the district of Nordfriesland, in Schleswig-Holstein, Germany. Its seat was in Hattstedt. In January 2008, it was merged with the Ämter Friedrichstadt, Nordstrand and Treene to form the Amt Nordsee-Treene.

The Amt Hattstedt consisted of the following municipalities:

Arlewatt 
Hattstedt
Hattstedtermarsch 
Horstedt 
Olderup 
Wobbenbüll

Former Ämter in Schleswig-Holstein